Gold Branch is a  long 2nd order tributary to Richardson Creek in Union County, North Carolina.

Course
Gold Branch rises in a pond about 1.5 miles southwest of New Salem, North Carolina and then flows south to join Richardson Creek at the north end of Polk Mountain.

Watershed
Gold Branch drains  of area, receives about 48.0 in/year of precipitation, has a wetness index of 420.59, and is about 36% forested.

References

Rivers of North Carolina
Rivers of Union County, North Carolina